The 2014 ATP Challenger China International – Nanchang was a professional tennis tournament played on hard courts. It was the first edition of the tournament which was part of the 2014 ATP Challenger Tour. It took place in Nanchang, China between 23 and 29 June 2014.

Singles main-draw entrants

Seeds

 1 Rankings are as of June 16, 2014.

Other entrants
The following players received wildcards into the singles main draw:
  Bai Yan
  Liu Siyu
  Ning Yuqing
  Te Rigele

The following players received entry from the qualifying draw:
  Kento Takeuchi
  Mikhail Ledovskikh
  Ryan Agar
  Wang Chuhan

Doubles main-draw entrants

Seeds

1 Rankings as of June 16, 2014.

Other entrants
The following pairs received wildcards into the doubles main draw:
  Hua Runhao /  Liu Siyu
  Chen Long /  Wu Hao
  Ning Yuqing /  Wang Aoran

Champions

Singles

  Go Soeda def.  Blaž Kavčič, 6–3, 2–6, 7–6(7–3)

Doubles

 Chen Ti /  Peng Hsien-yin def.  Jordan Kerr /  Fabrice Martin, 6–2, 3–6, [12–10]

External links
[ Official Website]

ATP Challenger China International - Nanchang
ATP Challenger China International - Nanchang
ATP Challenger China International – Nanchang